Heede may refer to:

People
 Frederic Van den Heede (born 1974), Belgian paralympic athlete
 Jean-Luc Van Den Heede (born 1945), French sailor
 Sylvia Vanden Heede (born 1961), Belgian author of children's books
 Vigor van Heede (1661–1708), Flemish painter

Places
 Heede, Lower Saxony, Germany
 Heede, Schleswig-Holstein, Germany